Gornji Tavankut is a village located in the Subotica municipality, in the North Bačka District of Serbia. It is situated in the autonomous province of Vojvodina. The village is ethnically mixed and its population numbering 1,381 people (2002 census).

Name
In Serbian the village is known as Gornji Tavankut or Горњи Таванкут, in Croatian as Gornji Tavankut, in Bunjevac as Gornji Tavankut,  and in Hungarian as Felsőtavankút.

Ethnic groups

1991 census
Bunjevci = 791
Croats = 359
Yugoslavs = 300
Serbs = 36
Hungarians = 17

2002 census
Croats = 546 (39.54%)
Bunjevci = 481 (34.83%)
Serbs = 100 (7.24%)
Yugoslavs = 94 (6.81%)
Hungarians = 44 (3.19%)

Historical population

1961: 7,476
1971: 6,729
1981: 1,879
1991: 1,526

Geography

The village consists of several relatively distinct areas ('kraj'), such as Skenderovo, Vuković kraj, Partizan, Rata.

See also
Donji Tavankut
List of places in Serbia
List of cities, towns and villages in Vojvodina

References
Slobodan Ćurčić, Broj stanovnika Vojvodine, Novi Sad, 1996.

External links
Gornji Tavankut - Vojvodina Portal

Places in Bačka
Subotica
Bunjevci